Branson may refer to:

Places 
Canada
 Branson, Toronto

United States
 Branson, Missouri, a popular tourist destination in the Ozark Mountains
 Branson, Colorado
 Branson City, California
 The Branson School, in Ross, California
 Warrenpoint (Knauertown, Pennsylvania), also known as the William Branson House

Other uses
 Branson (surname)
 Branson Ultrasonics, an ultrasonic technology company

See also 
 Branston (disambiguation)
 Bronson (disambiguation)